Nelson "Cadillac" Williams (September 26, 1917, Montgomery, Alabama – 1973, Voorburg, the Netherlands) was an American jazz trumpeter.

Williams began playing piano at age 13 and settled on trumpet soon afterwards; he may have played with blues pianist/singer Cow Cow Davenport while still a teenager. In the 1930s, he played in the territory bands Trianon Crackerjacks and Brown Skin Models, and acted as musical director for the Dixie Rhythm Girls. Around 1940, he left Alabama for Philadelphia, where he played with Tiny Bradshaw's band before joining the U.S. Army during World War II.

After the war, Billy Eckstine hired Williams, and following this he worked with John Kirby and pianist Billy Kyle. In 1949, he began the first of several stints with Duke Ellington, who bestowed upon him the nickname "Cadillac". In 1951, he left Ellington's employ and moved to Paris, where he led his own bands and recorded for French labels. He returned to Ellington in 1956, and played with him again in 1969 on a tour of Europe. He settled in the Netherlands, and died in 1973.

Discography

As leader
 Just Swinging (Philips, 1959)
 Rhythm Is My Business (CBS, 1967)
 The Great Traditionalists in Europe (MPS, 1969)
 Five Horn Groove & All Stars (BMG, 2005)

As sideman
With Duke Ellington
 Masterpieces by Ellington (Columbia, 1951)
 The World of Duke Ellington Volume 2 (Columbia, 1975)
 The World of Duke Ellington Volume 3 (Columbia, 1976)
 West Coast Tour (Jazz Bird, 1980)
 Paris Jazz Party (Affinity, 1981)
 Never-Before-Released 1965–1972 (Musicmasters, 1991)

With others
 Dutch Swing College Band, Big City Blues (Philips, 1962)
 Johnny Hodges, Castle Rock (Norgran, 1955)
 Cootie Williams, Cootie (Decca, 1959)
 Mary Lou Williams, I Made You Love Paris (Gitanes, 2000)

References

Eugene Chadbourne, [ Nelson Williams] at Allmusic

1917 births
1973 deaths
Musicians from Montgomery, Alabama
American jazz trumpeters
American male trumpeters
Duke Ellington Orchestra members
20th-century American musicians
Jazz musicians from Alabama
American male jazz musicians
20th-century American male musicians
United States Army personnel of World War II